Acrobasis porphyrella is a moth of the  family Pyralidae. It is known from Spain, Portugal, France, Corsica, Sardinia, the Balearic Islands, Italy and Croatia.

The larvae feed on Erica arborea and Erica scoparia.

References

Moths described in 1836
Acrobasis
Moths of Europe